Naxian marble is a large-crystaled white marble which is quarried from the Cycladic Island of Naxos in Greece. It was among the most significant types of marble for ancient Greece and it continues to be quarried in modern times.

Creation, mineralogy, properties 
 
The marble's creation is owed to high level metamorphic processes in a contact zone with dome-like bulges of migmatite. The two types of stone alternate in layers and the marble has a thickness of up to 30 metres in old fissures. The layers strike in a northeasterly direction.

Naxian marble is over 98% calcite. Other component minerals as dolomite, silicate and traces of graphite and pyrite. Calcite crystals are randomly distributed and usually transparent. This transparence gives the stone an appearance of depth and is the cause of the blue-grey shimmer of the marble, which is more or less noticeable depending on the angle of the light source. The crystals are up to 15 millimetres in diameter and it is thus one of the largest grained marbles on Earth. In the assessment of Raymond Perrier, it has a resistance to frost and other weathering.

Other parts of the deposit have a grey colour and are clearly striped, which indicates a higher level of impurities. This variant includes the unfinished Kouros of Apollonas in a quarry near  at the north end of the island.

In many parts of the deposit, there are grey, black and coloured mineral grains in the calcite crystals of the stone at a microscopic scale, making the crystals appear cloudy. Minor organic impurities are the cause of the slightly bitumen-like smell emitted while the marble is worked; it disappears after working.

Quarries 

]]

Some unfinished ancient pieces, like the Kouros of Apollonas or the two Kouroi of Flerio are found in these quarries.

History 
The use of this marble began in antiquity and has continued ever since. It was among the first types of Cycladic "island marble" to be used. It is the largest-grained marble which was used in ancient times.

In Roman times, Naxian marble has ceased to play an important role and Pliny the Elder does not mention it once.

Use and shaping 
Naxian marble is used for sculpture and decoration. In the Mediterranean region it is often employed for outdoor purposes. During the quarrying process, whiter parts of the stone are preferred. This preference has a direct impact on the price of Naxian marble in commerce. On the island it is used as a construction material for window and door frames as well as marble plaster; tailings are used as gravel and in road construction. About 5,000 m³ of high value Naxian marble is exported annually.

Numerous practical and artistic deployments of Naxian marble can be found on the island.

References

Bibliography 
 C. Colotouros: Marmor & Technologie. Vol. 2. Athen (no date)
 K. Germann, Gottfried Gruben et al.: "Provenance Characteristics of Cycladic (Paros and Naxos) Marbles — A Multivariate Geological Approach." In: Classical Marble: Geochemistry, Technology, Trade.  1988, pp. 251–262.
 : Griechische Marmorstudien. Verlag der Königl. Akademie der Wissenschaften, Berlin 1890 (Full text).
 Friedrich Müller: Internationale Natursteinkartei kompakt. Vol 82.4.
 Raymond Perrier: Les roches ornementales. Edition Pro Roc, Ternay 2004, .

Marble
Quarries in Greece
Mining in Greece
Naxos
Building stone